Santa is a town in the far west of Ivory Coast. It is a sub-prefecture of Ouaninou Department in Bafing Region, Woroba District.

Santa was a commune until March 2012, when it became one of 1126 communes nationwide that were abolished.
In 2014, the population of the sub-prefecture of Santa was 9,357.

Villages
The eleven villages of the sub-prefecture of Santa and their population in 2014 are:
 Drodougou (428)
 Gbagbadougou (236)
 Gondodougou (503)
 Gouékro (1 282)
 Kossagui (528)
 Kpoho 2 (857)
 Kpoho 3 (634)
 Nianlé (202)
 Santa (2 691)
 Séfesso (980)
 Zabanagoro (1 016)

Notes

Sub-prefectures of Bafing Region
Former communes of Ivory Coast